Canada (AG) v British Columbia (AG), also known as the Reference as to constitutional validity of certain sections of The Fisheries Act, 1914 and the Fish Canneries Reference, is a significant decision of the Judicial Committee of the Privy Council in determining the boundaries of federal and provincial jurisdiction in Canada. It is also significant, in that it represented a major victory in the fight against discrimination aimed at Japanese Canadians, which was especially prevalent in British Columbia in the early part of the 20th century.

Background

Until the early 1920s federal policy governing access to fishing licenses was basically open and
non-discriminatory. In 1922, under what became known as the "oriental exclusion policy", this was revised to provide for the reduction of the number of licenses granted to Japanese-Canadian fishermen, aiming to eventual total elimination of such licenses. In addition, conditions were attached for the prohibition of gas motors on such fishermen's vessels.

The controversy came to a head in 1927 as a prosecution against the Somerville Cannery Company for operating a cannery in Prince Rupert without a federal license. The cannery was operating as a floating clam cannery, the only one of its kind. All other canneries were on land. Francis Millerd, general manager and part-owner of Somerville, challenged the oriental exclusion policy through hiring Japanese-Canadian fishermen and lobbying to secure salmon fishing licenses for them. Charges against Somerville were dismissed, on the grounds that fish canneries did not require a federal license. Further pressure by Somerville and the Association of Fishermen of Japanese Origin resulted in the following reference questions being posed to the Supreme Court of Canada:

At the Supreme Court of Canada

The Supreme Court unanimously held that the provisions cited in Question 1 were ultra vires the Parliament of Canada, as fish canning only occurs after the fish have been caught, thus not being within the federal fisheries jurisdiction. As a fish cannery is similar in nature to a fruit or vegetable cannery, it is a civil right in the province in which it is carried on, and therefore subject to provincial jurisdiction.

Nor could such provisions be saved by resorting to another head of power:

It was unnecessary to answer Question 2.

In a 4-3 decision concerning Question 3, it was held that the Minister must issue fishing licenses to all qualified persons that paid the appropriate fee, and there was no discretionary authority to withhold such licenses.

Newcombe J (Anglin CJ and Rinfret and Lamont JJ, concurring) stated that the Minister could not exercise his licensing discretion in a discriminatory manner:

Duff J (Mignault and Smith JJ, concurring) believed that "There is nothing in the terms in which these provisions are expressed, nor, as far as I have been able to discover, in the terms of the regulations, pointing to a conclusion that the authority of the Minister is not a permissive one."

The federal government chose to ignore the ruling, pending appeal to the Privy Council. In the interim, prosecutions against Japanese-Canadian fishermen were being dismissed in the lower courts. The Association of Fishermen of Japanese Origin, having intervened in the hearing at the Supreme Court, were also respondents in the appeal.

At the Privy Council

The Judicial Committee upheld the ruling of the Supreme Court in its entirety. Before proceeding with the appeal at hand, Lord Tomlin considered the matter of where federal and provincial jurisdiction arise under Canadian constitutional law, and gave his summary of where the jurisprudence stood at that time:

Tomlin then turned to the question as to where jurisdiction over fish canneries fell. In that regard,

As such activity could not be seen to fall under any other heading of s. 91, and a licensing system could not reasonably be seen to be incidental to the federal power, it therefore fell within provincial jurisdiction.

The Association of Fishermen of Japanese Origin were awarded their costs in the appeal.

Impact

The gas boat restriction and the oriental exclusion policy were abandoned for the 1930 fishing season, and discrimination in the fishing industry came to an end.

On a larger view, the Fish Canneries Reference is considered to be one of the main foundations of Canadian constitutional jurisprudence, and its four-part summary of how to determine jurisdiction was subsequently cited with approval in the Aeronautics Reference in 1931.

The question of ministerial discretionary authority, and the extent as to how far it can go, continued to be debated, eventually to be settled by the Supreme Court in Roncarelli v. Duplessis.

See also
 Takahashi v. Fish and Game Commission: a similar case in California

References

Further reading
 
 

Canadian federalism case law
Judicial Committee of the Privy Council cases on appeal from Canada
1929 in Canadian case law
Fisheries law
Prince Rupert, British Columbia
Japanese Canadian
Fishing in Canada
Clams